The Journal of School Psychology is a quarterly peer-reviewed scientific journal covering school psychology. It was established in 1963 and is published by Elsevier on behalf of the Society for the Study of School Psychology, of which it is the official journal. The editor-in-chief is Craig Albers (University of Wisconsin–Madison). According to the Journal Citation Reports, the journal has a 2016 impact factor of 3.000.

References

External links

Publications established in 1963
Quarterly journals
Elsevier academic journals
English-language journals
Educational psychology journals